Affré or Affre is a French surname. Notable people with the surname include:

Agustarello Affre (1858–1931), French operatic tenor
Denis Auguste Affre (1793–1848), Archbishop of Paris
Pierre Affre (1590–1669), French sculptor

French-language surnames